Abrotanella muscosa is a member of the daisy family and is found on Stewart Island, New Zealand.

References

muscosa
Flora of New Zealand